Sunny (born June 11, 2012) is a pet dog of the Obama family, the 44th presidential family of the United States. Sunny is a female Portuguese Water Dog who was a First Dog of the United States along with Bo. Sunny was introduced via First Lady Michelle Obama's Twitter account on August 19, 2013.

Breed background

The Portuguese Water Dog is originally from the Algarve region of Portugal. Only 48 Portuguese Water Dogs were entered for Britain's Crufts competition in 2009 and the author of The New Complete Portuguese Water Dog, Kitty Braund, believes there are about 50,000 in North America. Due to its fleecy coat of non-shedding hair (instead of fur), the Portuguese Water Dog is considered a hypoallergenic dog breed.

Portuguese water dogs are superb swimmers, or superior seafarers, because they have webbed toes. The breed was important to fishers along the coast of Portugal as a companion and guard dog. 

Lisa Peterson, spokesperson for the American Kennel Club (AKC), stated, "The Portuguese water dog is historically a working dog, a fisherman's accompaniment. When you think of their history with fishermen, they were a team – that's the environment they thrive in." 

The breed was almost pushed to extinction toward the end of the nineteenth century until Vasco Bensaude, a wealthy Portuguese businessman, became interested in saving the breed in the 1930s.

Thirty years later the breed reached the United States, where they became classified in the Working Group. (recognized by the American Kennel Club) 

According to American Kennel Club, the dogs do jobs such as guard dog, pulling sleds, and rescuing people and things from water – they are mostly family friendly.

Breeding and original owners
Sunny is a purebred Portuguese Water Dog, and was selected from a breeder in the Great Lakes area.

Media response
Although Sunny was purchased from a breeder, president of The Humane Society of the United States, Wayne Pacelle, wrote on a blog post, "As we always say in such circumstances, we hope the Obamas considered adoption or rescue as the first choice in obtaining a pet." He further went on to thank the Obama family for making a contribution to the Humane Society in Sunny's name, and helping reduce the suffering of dogs, although he would like the policies to finally become law.

Incidents
There have been minor incidents involving Sunny. In 2013, at a Military family arts and crafts event, Sunny knocked over a 2-year-old girl while in front of Michelle Obama. However, the child was unharmed. Sunny was not aggressive to the child, licking her face. In January 2017, Sunny reportedly bit a White House visitor on the face, leaving a cut under the visitor's eye, which required stitches. The visitor, who was a teen friend of Malia, was treated by the president's physician Dr. Ronny Jackson.

See also
 Bo
 United States presidential pets
 List of individual dogs

References

External links

2012 animal births
United States presidential dogs
Obama family